The Ministry of Finance is a ministry in Zambia. It is headed by the Minister of Finance, who is responsible for public finances.

Ministers
Arthur Wina, 1964-1967
Elijah Mudenda, 1967-1968
Simon Kapwepwe, 1968-1969
Elijah Mudenda, 1969-1970
John Mwanakatwe, 1970-1981
Kebby Musokotwane, 1981-1982 
Luke Mwananshiku, 1982-1987 
Gibson Chigaga, 1987-1991
Emmanuel Kasonde, 1991-1993
Ronald Penza, 1993-1998 
Edith Nawakwi, 1998-1999
Katele Kalumba, 1999-2003 
N’gandu Peter Magande, 2003-2008 
Situmbeko Musokotwane, 2008-2011 
Alexander Chikwanda, 2011-2016
Felix Mutati, 2016-2018 
Margaret Mwanakatwe, 2018-2019 
Bwalya Ng’andu, 2019-2021

External links
Ministry website

References

Finance
Finance
 
Zambia
Economy of Zambia